Trypetoptera canadensis is a species of marsh fly in the family Sciomyzidae.

References

External links

 

Sciomyzidae
Articles created by Qbugbot
Insects described in 1843
Taxa named by Pierre-Justin-Marie Macquart